Dian Hemamali Sangeetha Weeraratne (born December 13, 1973, as (Sinhala:සංගීතා වීරරත්න) is a Sri Lankan film actress in the Sri Lankan cinema. She made her debut as a sixteen-year-old with Roy de Silva's It's a Matter of Time opposite Kamal Addararachchi in 1990. However, she earned immense popularity only after performing in H.D. Premaratne's Saptha Kanya, also opposite Kamal Addararachchi in 1993. It was a huge success and she won the Sarasaviya Best Newcomer Award that year. Since then she has acted in over 50 movies and is regarded as one of the most successful stars of the Sri Lankan film industry.

Personal life
Sangeetha Weeraratne was born the second daughter of renowned cinematographer Timothy Weeraratne and his wife Daisy. She had her primary education at St. John's College Panadura and then moved on to Methodist College, Colombo for her secondary studies.

She has an elder sister, Nayanatara Weeraratne who currently lives in Australia. Sangeetha married to a businessman, Roshantha Kariyapperuma in December 2002. Her husband Roshantha Kariyapperuma & his older brother Priyantha Kariyapperuma owns and jointly operates the company Voice of Asia Network (Pvt) Ltd which is the largest Media Network in Sri Lanka.

Career
Sangeetha made her debut in to the silver screen through the renowned director Roy de Silva with his film It's a Matter of Time in 1991. She had the rare fortune of mingling with some of the popular stars of the time, such as Malini Fonseka, Vijaya Kumaratunga, Gamini Fonseka and Roy de Silva.

In 2001, Weeraratne won the Sarasaviya Best Actress Award for her role as Guneris' wife in Aswesuma directed by Bennet Ratnayake. She was also crowned the Sarasaviya Most Popular Actress for three consecutive years from 2001 to 2003.

Some films where she played memorable dramatic roles include Saptha Kanya, Nomiyena Minisun, Maruthaya, Duwata Mawaka Misa, Dorakada Marawa, Kinihiriya Mal, Aswesuma, Salelu Warama and Dheewari. She also appeared in few blockbuster comedy movies such as Dawal Migel Ra Daniyel series and Sapata Dukata Sunny as well.

In 2000, she presented the television documentary program Gedara Dora, which was based on Architecture, Interior Design and Landscaping. It was telecast Rupavahini - 1 at 9.30 p.m. on every Tuesday.' In 2003, after a lay-off of seven years, Weeraratne acted in a television serial Theertha Tharanaya directed by Bermin Lylie Fernando.

She launched her first production with the film, Sewwandi directed by Vasantha Obeysekera in 2006. Her latest dramatic film is Uppalawanna directed by Prof. Sunil Ariyaratne, where she plays the role of Upuli and later the bhikkhuni, Uppalawanna was also critically acclaimed.

In 2021, she appeared in the Raffealla Fernando Celebrity Calendar along with many other Sri Lankan celebrities.

Filmography 
Since her first film in 1991, she has acted more than 40 films which are commercially successful.

 No. denotes the Number of Sri Lankan film in the Sri Lankan cinema.

Awards
She is a recipient of many state awards in many times for many categories.

Sarasaviya Film Festival

|-
|| 1993 ||| Saptha Kanya || Best Newcomer || 
|-
|| 1994 ||| Nomiyena Minissu || Best Actress || 
|-
|| 1995 ||| Maruthaya || Merit Award || 
|-
|| 2002 ||| Maruthaya || Most Popular Actress ||

Presidential Film Festival

|-
|| 1999 ||| Pawuru Walalu || Best Supporting Actress ||

Critic Awards

|-
|| 1996 ||| Dorakada Marawa || Best Actress ||

OCIC Awards

|-
|| 1998 ||| Dorakada Marawa || Best Actress ||

Other Festivals

|-
|| 2000 ||| Junior Chamber of Arts of Sri Lanka || Outstanding young personality || 
|-
|| 2001 ||| Aswesuma || Best Actress || 
|-
|| 2001 ||| Aswesuma || Most Popular Actress ||

References

External links
 
සංගීතා වීරරත්න සමඟ ආදරණීය කතාබහක්
දැන් මම ගරු රඟපෑම් කරන්නේ නෑ - සම්මානනීය රංගවේදිනි සංගීතා වීරරත්න
No politics for me, says Sangeetha

1973 births
Living people
Sinhalese actresses
Sri Lankan film actresses
Alumni of Methodist College, Colombo
Alumni of St. John's College, Panadura